Like all municipalities of Puerto Rico, Corozal is subdivided into administrative units called barrios, which are roughly comparable to minor civil divisions. The barrios in turn, are further subdivided into smaller local populated place areas/units called sectores (sectors in English). The types of sectores may vary, from normally sector to urbanización to reparto to barriada to residencial, among others. Some sectors appear in two barrios.

List of sectors by barrio

Abras
Although Abras officially consists of only one single barrio, it is traditionally subdivided into three areas or sub-barrios:

Abras
Sector Cueva de Paca
Sector El Brillante
Sector Hoya Ranch
Sector La Alcoba
Sector La Calabaza
Sector La Pollera
Sector Los Ramos
Sector Los Torres
Sector Marcelo Rosado
Sector Parcelas
Sector Víctor Pantojas
Urbanización Vista del Río I
Urbanización Vista del Río II
Urbanización Vista del Río III

Abras Centro
Sector Carretera (from La Capilla to Sector Sandoval)
Sector Chago Adorno
Sector Charol
Sector El Convento
Sector La Capilla
Sector La Escuelita
Sector Lorenzo Agosto
Sector Los Bruno
Sector Sandoval

Abras Mavilla
Sector Adolfa
Sector Balalaika
Sector El Batey
Sector Los Bruno
Sector Los Mudos
Sector Los Rolones
Sector Los Rosado
Sector Los Torres
Urbanización Jardines de Mavilla
Urbanización Las Brisas
Urbanización Quintas de Plaza Aquarium
Urbanización San Rafael

Cibuco
Although Cibuco officially consists of only one single barrio, it is traditionally subdivided into three areas or sub-barrios:

Cibuco 1
Sector Academia
Sector Aníbal Cabranes
Sector Baja del Palo
Sector Boina
Sector Geño Trinidad
Sector La Escuela
Sector Los Crespo
Sector Los Puertos
Sector Los Torres
Sector Los Trinidad
Sector Maguayo
Sector Mingo Negrón
Sector Nela Nevárez
Sector Tomás Colón
Urbanización Estancias de Cibuco
Urbanización Los Próceres
Urbanización Villas de Cibuco

Cibuco 2
Extensión Sylvia
Sector Acueducto
Sector Empalme
Sector Guevara
Sector Julio Ortega
Sector Korea
Sector La Mina
Sector Layo Rosado
Sector Los Mangoes
Sector Los Pacheco
Sector Millo Maldonado
Sector Monte de las Brujas
Sector Pepe Pizza
Sector Rolo Barrera
Urbanización Alturas de Cibuco
Urbanización Cibuco
Urbanización Colinas de Corozal
Urbanización Sylvia

Cibuco 3
Sector El Vironay
Sector Juan Vázquez
Sector Lin Pérez
Urbanización Valle de Aramaná
Urbanización Villas de Monte Verde

Corozal barrio-pueblo
Barriada Aldea Vázquez
Barriada Bou
Calle Carmelo Aponte
Calle Cervantes
Calle Colegio Católico
Calle Culto
Calle Gándara
Calle Genaro Bou
Calle Howard T. Jason
Calle José Valiente
Calle La Marina
Calle Las Mercedes
Calle Nueva
Calle San Manuel
Calle Urbano Ramírez
Calle Santo Domingo
Calle Sostre
Calle San Ramón
Desvío Urbano
Extensión Sobrino
Residencial El Centro
Residencial Enrique Landrón
Sector Alcantarilla
Sector Alfonso Matos
Sector Cantera
Sector Portugués
Urbanización Sanfeliz
Urbanización Sobrino

Cuchillas
Sector Berio
Sector Car Wash
Sector Collazo
Sector Guayabo
Sector Hormigas II
Sector La Pajona
Sector Los Cocos
Sector Los Indios
Sector Los Rosado
Sector Millo Santiago
Sector Siquín Morales
Sector Tivo Vázquez
Sector Toñito Santiago

Dos Bocas
Calle Leoncito Ortiz
Parcelas Ortiz
Sector Ángel Vázquez
Sector Benjamín González
Sector Bernardo Padilla
Sector Caldero
Sector Carmelo Ortiz (Los Batatos)
Sector Carretera (from Dos Bocas entrance to Sector Mingo Díaz)
Sector Daniel Negrón
Sector El Faro
Sector El Quinto
Sector El Típico
Sector Honduras
Sector Julio Vázquez
Sector La Mina
Sector La Santa
Sector Leoncito Ortíz
Sector Los García
Sector Los Maldonado
Sector Los Marrero
Sector Los Miranda
Sector Mingo Díaz
Sector Moncho Santos
Sector Neco Chévere
Sector Sioso Virella
Urbanización Loma Linda
Urbanización San Francisco

Magueyes
Sector Capilla
Sector Escuela
Sector Grego Meléndez
Sector Lechería
Sector Los Carros
Sector Los González

Maná
Sector Andreu
Sector Estancias de Maná
Sector Ferdinand Santiago
Sector La Escuela
Sector La Vega
Sector Los Berríos
Sector Los Berros
Sector Los Lozada
Sector Los Pilones
Sector Los Zayas
Sector Manchuria
Sector Monchito Pérez
Sector Pocito Dulce
Sector Quebrada Fría
Sector Varo Mercado
Sector William Alvarado

Negros
Sector Acueducto
Sector África
Sector Carretera (from Amado Suárez to Iglesia Católica)
Sector La Hacienda
Sector La Planá
Sector Lorencito Frau
Sector Los Gatos
Sector Los Pérez
Sector Los Quiñones
Sector Parcelas
Sector Pepín García
Urbanización Los Hermanos

Padilla
Although Padilla officially consists of only one single barrio, it is traditionally subdivided into two areas or sub-barrios:

Padilla
Sector Campo Viejo
Sector El Almendro
Sector El Jíbaro
Sector El Limón
Sector Empalme
Sector La Coroza
Sector La Guinea
Sector La Herradura
Sector Layo Rivera
Sector Los Baños
Sector Los Llanos
Sector Parcelas
Sector Pepito Marrero
Sector Virella
Urbanización Alturas de Padilla
Urbanización La Providencia

Padilla Ermita
Sector Collores
Sector Ermita
Sector Experimental
Sector Hormigas I
Sector Los Caobos
Sector Los Carrasco
Sector Los Figueroa
Sector Los Moreno
Sector Los Rodríguez
Sector Marungo
Sector Navarro
Sector Pablo Vázquez
Sector Villarreal

Palmarejo
Barriada Decene
Calle Juana Santiago
Parcelas Guarico
Parcelas Julián Marrero
Sector Alejo Rosado
Sector Alturas de Corozal
Sector Chary
Sector Cheo Marrero
Sector Club de Leones
Sector Corozal Hills
Sector Cuchillas
Sector Dolores Cosme
Sector El Convento
Sector El Picuíto
Sector El Pomito
Sector El Rancho
Sector Félix Padilla
Sector Guarico
Sector Juana Santiago
Sector La Buruquena
Sector La Gallera
Sector La Mina
Sector Los Fonseca
Sector Los Llanos
Sector Los Negrones
Sector Los Nieves (from cemetery to La Gallera)
Sector Los Panzardi
Sector Los Rojas
Sector Luis Collazo
Sector Marrero
Sector Pancho Febus
Sector Pomo Rodríguez
Sector Tom Rolón
Sector Toño Patente
Urbanización Estancias de Palmarejo
Urbanización Los Policías
Urbanización María del Carmen

Palmarito
Although Palmarito officially consists of only one single barrio, it is traditionally subdivided into two areas or sub-barrios:

Palmarito
Parcelas Berio Nuevas
Parcelas Berio Viejas
Sector Albaladejo
Sector Chago Torres
Sector Che Díaz
Sector Eduardo Rivera
Sector El Riachuelo
Sector Félix Padilla
Sector Finito Santiago
Sector Frank Ortiz
Sector Geño Rivera
Sector Los Molina
Sector Pifio Rivera
Sector Pimo Ortiz
Urbanización Estancias de la Montaña

Palmarito Centro
Sector El Cuatro
Sector El Perico (La PRA)
Sector Finín  Lozada
Sector La Gallera
Sector Los Montesino
Sector Los Peña
Sector Marciano Burgos
Sector Radio Oro (La Emisora)

Palos Blancos
Parcelas Medina
Sector Amado Suárez
Sector Baldino Ortiz
Sector Carretera (from Ángel Vázquez to Manuel Ortiz)
Sector Colón
Sector Demetrio Pacheco
Sector El Cacique
Sector El Pegao
Sector El Siete (7)
Sector Gobeo
Sector Héctor Ortiz
Sector La Arena
Sector La Loma
Sector La Perla
Sector La Pollera
Sector La Quinta
Sector La Riviera
Sector La Vega
Sector Lino Caldero
Sector Los Morales
Sector Los Rodríguez
Sector Los Bagué
Sector Los Febus
Sector Los Guzmanes
Sector Los Morales (Emérito)
Sector Los Padilla
Sector Los Ramos
Sector Los Ruiz
Sector Los Velilla
Sector Maná
Sector Manuel Ortiz
Sector Marcelino López
Sector Nono Negrón
Sector Pepe Córdova
Sector Pepín Rodríguez
Sector Quiliche
Sector Rolo Pacheco
Sector Pura Molina
Sector Tato López
Sector Varela
Sector Virella

Pueblo
Barriada Cuba Libre (Calle María Bou, Calle O’Neil, Calle Ramos, Calle Rivera)
Calle Nieves
Sector Georgies Pizza
Sector Guayabal
Sector Idilio
Sector Kike Matos
Sector La Alcoba
Sector La Bodega
Sector La Frigo
Sector Lin Santos
Sector Los Moreno
Sector Los Torres
Sector Mario Electricista
Sector Maya Marzán
Sector Paseo del Río
Urbanización Cerromonte
Urbanización Monterrey
Urbanización Monte Verde

See also

 List of communities in Puerto Rico

References

External links
 

Corozal
Corozal